The Old Wives' Tale is a 1921 British drama film directed by Denison Clift and starring Fay Compton, Florence Turner and Henry Victor. It is based on the 1908 novel The Old Wives' Tale by Arnold Bennett.

Cast
 Fay Compton - Sophie Barnes
 Florence Turner - Constance Barnes
 Henry Victor - Gerald
 Francis Lister - Cyril Povey
 Mary Brough - Mrs Barnes
 Joseph R. Tozer - Chirac
 Norman Page - Samuel Povey
 Drusilla Wills - Maggie
 Tamara Karsavina - Dancer

References

External links

1921 films
1921 drama films
British drama films
British silent feature films
Films based on works by Arnold Bennett
Films directed by Denison Clift
Films set in Paris
Films set in Staffordshire
Ideal Film Company films
British black-and-white films
1920s English-language films
1920s British films
Silent drama films